Drowning in Holy Water (Persian: مردن در آب مطهر, romanized: Mordan dar abe motahhar) is a 2020 Iranian drama film directed and written by Navid Mahmoudi and produced by Jamshid Mahmoudi. The film screened for the first time at the 38th Fajr Film Festival and received 2 nominations.

Cast 

 Matin Heydarinia as Hamed
 Ali Shadman as Sohrab
 Neda Jebraeili as Setareh
 Sadaf Asgari as Rona
 Alireza Ara as Nader
 Sogol Khaligh as Afghan immigrant girl
 Amirreza Ranjbaran as Afghan immigrant boy
 Mahtab Jafari as Afghan immigrant girl
 Khayam Vaghar as Rona's brother
 Peiman Moghadami as Human trafficker
 Farid Eshaqi as Police
 Fatemeh Shokri as Miss Lili
 Alireza Mehran as Ghaffar
 Keyvn Beygi as Amir
 Mohammad Ali Entezarian as Costumer
 Fatemeh Mirzaei
 Mahya Rezayi

Reception

Accolades

References

External links 

 

2020s Persian-language films
Iranian drama films
2020 films
2020 drama films